Live in Berlin may refer to:

Live in Berlin (Art Ensemble of Chicago album), 1991
Live in Berlin (Depeche Mode album), 2014
Live in Berlin (Marilyn Crispell album), 1984
Live in Berlin (Jennifer Rostock album), 2012
Live in Berlin (Rozz Williams album), 2000
Live in Berlin (Sting album), 2010
Live in Berlin, an album by Kriwi, 2004
Live in Berlin, Vols. I and II, two albums by the Lounge Lizards, 1991/1992
Acoustic Trio Live in Berlin, an album by Willy DeVille, 2002
In Berlin, also released as Live in Berlin, an album by Blurt, 1981
Live aus Berlin, an album by Rammstein, 1998
Live aus Berlin (Rosenstolz album), 2003
La Ultima / Live in Berlin, an album and concert film by Böhse Onkelz, 2005
The Wall – Live in Berlin, a concert staging of Pink Floyd's The Wall by Roger Waters, 1990
Live in East Berlin, a video by Kreator, 1990